Voljavče  is a village in the municipality of Jagodina, Serbia. According to the 2002 census, the village had a population of 1,813.

References

Populated places in Pomoravlje District